|}

This is a list of electoral district results for the 1921 Victorian state election.

Results by electoral district

Abbotsford

Albert Park

Allandale

Ballarat East

Ballarat West

Barwon 

 Edward Morley was elected in the 1920 election as an Independent Nationalist, but joined the Nationalists before this election.

Benalla

Benambra

Bendigo East

Bendigo West

Boroondara

Borung

Brighton

Brunswick

Bulla

Carlton

Castlemaine and Maldon

Collingwood 

 Two candidate preferred vote was estimated.

Dalhousie

Dandenong

Daylesford

Dundas

Eaglehawk

East Melbourne

Essendon

Evelyn

Fitzroy

Flemington

Geelong

Gippsland East

Gippsland North

Gippsland South

Gippsland West

Glenelg

Goulburn Valley

Grenville

Gunbower

Hampden 

 Two party preferred vote was estimated.

Hawthorn

Jika Jika

Kara Kara

Korong

Lowan

Maryborough

Melbourne

Mornington

North Melbourne

Ovens

Polwarth

Port Fairy

Port Melbourne

Prahran

Richmond

Rodney

St Kilda

Stawell and Ararat

Swan Hill

Toorak

Upper Goulburn

Walhalla

Wangaratta

Waranga

Warrenheip

Warrnambool

Williamstown

See also 

 1921 Victorian state election
 Candidates of the 1921 Victorian state election
 Members of the Victorian Legislative Assembly, 1921–1924

References 

Results of Victorian state elections
1920s in Victoria (Australia)